The OPPO R11 is a phablet smartphone based on Android 7.1, which was unveiled on 10 June 2017. The model has a front camera of 20MP and a dual rear primary camera that has a 20MP telephoto lens and a 16MP wide-angle lens.

Specifications 
OPPO R11 contains a Qualcomm MSM8956 Plus Snapdragon 660 octa-core processor with 3 or 4GB of RAM and 64 or 128GB of expandable storage, and provides of a 6-inch, 1080p IPS LCD capacitive touchscreen display. The model is conceived with Oppo Electronics’ own operating system, ColorOS 3.1.

OPPO R11 runs on Android 7.1 and is powered by 2900mAh non-removable battery. The phone has connectivity options that include Wi-Fi and GPS. It also has sensors which include an accelerometer and proximity sensor

Photography 
OPPO R11 comprises a front camera of 20MP and a dual rear primary camera that offers portrait mode. The rear camera consists of a 20MP telephoto lens and a 16MP wide angle lens.

VOOC Flash Charging 
Like all other flagships, the OPPO R11 is equipped with the VOOC Flash Charging technology.

Limited Editions

TFBOYS Limited Edition 
OPPO R11 TFBOYS Limited Edition is divided into three versions, OPPO R11 Karry Wang Limited Edition, OPPO R11 Roy Way Limited Edition and OPPO R11 Jackson Yi Limited Edition.

This edition is in black only and the exterior of each model is embellished with TFBOYS's triangle logo along with the usual OPPO logo. The TFBOYS Limited Edition contains respective signatures of the three members which are carved on the back.

The phone has an exclusive interface which follows the colour theme of each member, Karry Wang in blue, Roy Way in green and Jackson Yi in red. Each model to this edition is included of an exclusive build-in video of TFBOYS.

FC Barcelona Limited Edition 
OPPO R11 Barcelona Limited Edition was released in Shanghai on August 8, 2017. Exterior to this limited edition contains an embedded 18K gold plated badge at the back, built-in FC Barcelona wallpapers and a protection casing that contains signature of the club's members.

R11s 
R11s is an improved version of R11. The R11s has a double f / 1.7 large aperture which can automatically identify the lighting conditions.
The R11s was available in Singapore from 2 December 2017 and in Australia from 5 February 2018.

References 

Android (operating system) devices
Mobile phones introduced in 2017
Oppo smartphones
Mobile phones with multiple rear cameras
Discontinued smartphones